Tynte's Castle is a tower house located in Youghal, Ireland.

Location

The tower was originally on the riverfront, but when the Blackwater River silted up and changed course in the 17th–18th centuries, it was left  from the water.

History

Tynte's Castle was built in the late 15th century by the Walsh family, Cambro-Norman merchants who built stores and fortified houses in the town to protect their trade goods. After the Second Desmond Rebellion (1579–1583) they were stripped of their property, which reverted to the Crown. The tower was leased to Sir Robert Tynte (1571–1663) in the late 16th century and refurbished in 1643.

Oliver Cromwell's army entered Youghal in 1649 during the Cromwellian conquest of Ireland; it is assumed that it was used to quarter Parliamentarian soldiers. In 1689, during the reign of King James II, it was used as a prison for Cromwell supporters and an attempt was made to burn it down.

The castle remained with the Tyntes until it was sold in 1866 to William Raymond FitzMaurice, a wealthy Anglo-Irish landowner. The castle was acquired by the McCarthy family in the 1950s, who have restored it. It is now open to tourists.

Building

A fortified stone tower of three storeys, with base batter. It has a hipped slate roof with machicolations, Irish crenellations and a murder hole. There are large windows in the west wall topped with brick arches; these were probably added in the 19th century when the castle was used as a granary.

References

Castles in County Cork
Buildings and structures in Youghal
Towers completed in the 15th century
15th-century establishments in Ireland
Tower houses in the Republic of Ireland